Convolvulus sabatius, the ground blue-convolvulus or blue rock bindweed, is a species of flowering plant in the family Convolvulaceae, native to Italy and North Africa, and often seen in cultivation.

The Latin specific epithet sabatius refers to the Savona region of Italy.

Cultivation
This species is often sold under the synonym C. mauritanicus. Although a perennial, it is best treated as an annual in colder climates. It is suited to window boxes and containers and prefers a sunny situation with good drainage. Tip pruning encourages new growth and flowering. It has gained the Royal Horticultural Society's Award of Garden Merit.

References 

sabatius
Flora of Italy